Kanwar Pal Gurjar was a speaker of the Haryana Legislative Assembly from 26 October 2014 to 4 November 2019. He belongs to Bharatiya Janata Party and was elected to the assembly from Jagadhri two times. He was born in Yamunanagar, Haryana.

Life and career
Gujjar was born on 8 May 1960 in Bahadurpur to Chandan Singh and Jagwati Devi. He did matriculation from Haryana Board of School Education, Bhiwani in 1976-1977 and then pursued Bachelor of Arts from Mukund Lal College Yamunanagar, Kurukshetra University in 1979, but dropped out in the second year. Gujjar is married to Sunita Gujjar, with whom he has two daughters and a son, Nischal Chaudary.

He became MLA twice. He was elected MLA in 2000 when INLD-BJP ruled the state.

References

1960 births
Living people
Speakers of the Haryana Legislative Assembly
Haryana MLAs 2014–2019
People from Yamunanagar district
Bharatiya Janata Party politicians from Haryana
Haryana MLAs 2019–2024